The Santee Sioux Reservation of the Santee Sioux (also known as the Eastern Dakota) was established in 1863 in present-day Nebraska. The tribal seat of government is located in Niobrara, Nebraska, with reservation lands in Knox County.

History
Established by an Act of the U.S. Congress on March 3, 1863, the Niobrara Reservation was officially recognized in an Executive Order dated February 27, 1866, and in treaties dated November 16, 1867 and April 29, 1868. Additional executive orders applying to the reservation were dated August 31, 1869, December 31, 1873, and February 9, 1885.

The reservation (shown as Dakota Reservation on the map at right) lies along the south bank of the Missouri River, and includes part of Lewis and Clark Lake. As of the 2000 census, the reservation recorded a resident population of 878, of which 64.1% were Native American and 33.7% White. Its land area is 172.99 mi.² (447.84 km2). The major center of population is the village of Santee, in the northernmost portion of the reservation.

Other major populations of Oglala Lakota and Brulé Sioux are located to the north on reservations within South Dakota.

Government 
Chief Wabasha was the first and last head chief of the Santee Sioux until his death in 1876. The first tribal council election was held on January 22, 1878, following a unanimous vote to end the old chief system.

Communities
Lindy
Santee

See also 
 Native American tribes in Nebraska
 Sioux
 Wabasha III, head chief of Santee Sioux
John Trudell, activist, poet, actor, and musician whose father was Santee Dakota and who grew up near the Santee Sioux Reservation

References

External links 
 Official reservation homepage.
 Reservation tract map from the US Census.
 Santee Normal Training School, Woonspe Wankantu, 1881, 1882, 1884, 1885 from the American Board of Commissioners for Foreign Missions.

American Indian reservations in Nebraska
Knox County
1863 establishments in Nebraska Territory
States and territories established in 1863
Santee Dakota